Athena is a  factory ship which was built in 1992. In October 2010, she caught fire off the Isles of Scilly. In May 2011 she caught fire while lying at the harbour of Runavík in Skálafjørður, Faroe Islands. It happened at night, and people who lived on the other side of the fjord, where the smoke was headed, were evacuated. Some months later the ship was sold to Smedegaarden in Esbjerg, which took her apart.

Construction
The ship is a  factory ship.

She is equipped with two  Deutz auxiliary diesel engines. Athena is also equipped with a  bow thruster.

History
The contract for building the ship was signed on 24 February 1989. Built by Factorias Vulcano SA, Vigo as yard number 503, her keel was laid on 9 October 1991 and she was launched on 20 February 1992. Completion was on 1 November 1992.

Originally named Kapitan Azarkin, she was built for Rybcomflot Moscow, Russia. She was allocated the IMO number 8907096. In 2001, she was awarded by a court judgement to Laskaridis Shipping Co Ltd, Athens, Greece, and was renamed Athena. Renamed Athena in 2004, she was sold in 2005 to Davlos Shipping Ltd, followed by a sale later that year to Atlantic Wave Co Ltd, the nationalities of which are not recorded.

She was renamed Skadi at this time. She was then sold to Ocean Group Faroes Ltd, Hósvík, regaining the name Athena. In 2008, she was renamed Athena II, returning to Athena in 2009. Her port of registry is Hósvík and Athena is allocated the MMSI number 231411000.

The Maritime and Coastguard Agency at Falmouth were alerted to the ship's distress at 06:00 British Summer Time (05:00 UTC). The container ship  went to her assistance. A Dassault Falcon 50 from France was despatched to co-ordinate communications between the ships and coastguard. A Sea King helicopter of 771 Naval Air Squadron, based at RNAS Culdrose, was scrambled to the Isles of Scilly, where it was refuelled and held ready for use should it be required. The aircraft would have been able to spend only 20 minutes on scene at a time, as Athena was at the limit of its range. Ninety-eight of the 111 crew left Athena in lifeboats, leaving 13 to fight the fire. Once she arrived, specialist firefighters were transported to the ship to assess the fire, which was thought to be still burning at the time. Vega, with the 98 crew rescued from Athena, was originally bound for Jamaica.
She later diverted to Falmouth to disembark the rescuees.

On 28 October, twelve firemen from Cornwall Fire and Rescue Service were airlifted to Athena by helicopter. At 17:00, the officer in charge of the firefighting operation ordered the ship evacuated because of a release of carbon dioxide. On 30 October, salvors boarded Athena to assess the damage done to her by the fire. On 2 November, Athena was still being held off Famouth. Salvors from Smit International were reported as fighting the fire, which was still burning, and assessing whether or not it was safe to bring Athena into port. The tug Anglian Earl was giving assistance.

On 9 May 2011, Athena was lying at the harbour of Saltangará in Runavík municipality in the Faroe Islands. Shortly after midnight, a fire on board Athena was reported to the Faroese authorities.  There was a lot of smoke and the wind direction was towards the villages on the other side of the Skálafjørður fjord. The people who lived in the villages of Skála and Glyvrar were evacuated at around four in the morning to a community house in Strendur, a neighbouring village. Four men were working on board when the accident happened. The police later reported that the fire was probably caused by the materials which the men were using during their work. Some months later the ship was sold to Esbjerg in Denmark, where she will be broken up.

References

External links
Photo of Athena in October 2010

1992 ships
Ships built in Spain
Merchant ships of Russia
Fishing vessels of Greece
Merchant ships of South Korea
Merchant ships of the Faroe Islands
Maritime incidents in 2010
Maritime incidents in 2011
Maritime incidents in the Faroe Islands